Alexander McLean or MacLean may refer to:
Alexander McLean (Province of Canada politician) (1793–1875), Canadian political figure
AJ McLean (born 1978), American musician and singer
Alec McLean (born 1950), New Zealand rower
Alex McLean, British musician and researcher
Alex MacLean (born 1947), American photographer
Alex MacLean (footballer), Scottish footballer
Alexander Grant McLean (1824–1862), Surveyor General of New South Wales (Australia)
Alexander Kenneth Maclean (1869–1942), Canadian politician and judge
Alexander Neil McLean (1885–1967), former member of the Senate of Canada from New Brunswick
Alexander McLean (activist) (born 1985), founder of African Prisons Project
Alexander McLean, sea captain and the basis for the protagonist in The Sea-Wolf, a Jack London story
Alexander Maclean, 13th Laird of Ardgour (1764–1855), soldier and Highland laird